The Gem City Jam is a college basketball rivalry between the 
University of Dayton Flyers and the Wright State Raiders.

The class-driven cross-town rivalry began in 1988, playing over the years to large 
raucous crowds packing both school's 10,000 seat arenas.  UD has declined to renew the contest each year since the 97-98
season.

Series Origins 
The Dayton Flyers team is a regional basketball power with 
a long tradition of excellence going back to the early 20th century.  UD is proud to represent
the leaders and elite of Dayton.  Few fan bases in the country rival Dayton's for passion 
and ticket sales.

Wright Sate basketball is a much younger program,
playing its first basketball in the 1970's.  Wright State built a scrappy fan following at the 
Division II level with fast, aggressive teams and its 1983 National Championship.

The coaches and administrations for both schools enjoyed close relationships leading to UD making a verbal
agreement to play the suburban school once they moved to Division I.

Series Suspension 
Despite having a winning
record in the series, UD has declined to renew the contest each year since the 1997–98
season. This change in posture resulted from new administration coming to power at UD
that did not think as highly of the cross-town institution. Without an official reason for
the suspension in the series, many theories have been offered in the press and around town.
Due to the dramatic social gulf between the elite private school student body and the 
working class state school, a considerable amount of resentment has grown around this 
decision.

The Dayton Daily News and other local 
media have called annually for a renewal of the contest as a Dayton civic asset. 

Wright State remains optimistic that the
series will continue.

Game results

References 

College basketball rivalry trophies in the United States
College basketball rivalries in the United States
Basketball in Dayton, Ohio
Dayton Flyers basketball
Wright State Raiders basketball